羅蘭 may refer to:
Law Lan (born 1934), actress from Hong Kong
Luo Lan (1919–2015), Taiwanese writer and radio personality